Orlovka is a rural locality (a village) in Tenyayevsky Selsoviet, Fyodorovsky District, Bashkortostan, Russia. The population was 152 as of 2010. There are 6 streets.

Geography 
Orlovka is located 19 km northwest of Fyodorovka (the district's administrative centre) by road. Kazanka is the nearest rural locality.

References 

Rural localities in Fyodorovsky District